KWMU (90.7 FM) are the call letters for St. Louis Public Radio's stations, KWMU-1, Jazz KWMU-2, and Classical KWMU-3, in St. Louis, Missouri, United States. St. Louis Public Radio broadcasts in HD Radio utilizing extra subchannels. KWMU-1, 90.7 FM, is the flagship NPR station in the region. 

St. Louis Public Radio (STLPR) also broadcasts on KMST in Rolla, MO, and WQUB in Quincy, IL, and produces regional news coverage, local arts and news programs, and original podcasts.

It is licensed to the Curators of the University of Missouri System and operates as part of the University of Missouri-St. Louis. Its studios are located in Grand Center in midtown St. Louis.

About St. Louis Public Radio (STLPR)
St. Louis Public Radio's website states that its mission is "To inform and provide a deeper understanding and appreciation of events, ideas and cultures for a more inspired and engaged public."

First signing on the air on June 2, 1972, STLPR has more than 500,000 readers and listeners in the St. Louis area. The station employs more than 30 journalists and has a total staff of over 70, with hundreds of volunteers helping for special events. In 1983, it was the first radio station in St. Louis to play music from compact discs. A year later, it became the first radio station in the United States to broadcast Ambisonic programs. In 1992, the station increased its effective radiated power to 100,000 watts. In 1995, the station moved to an all-news format.

STLPR started broadcasting in HD Radio in 2006.  In the fall of 2008, the station added a second digital stream, KWMU-2 The Gateway (Now Jazz KWMU-2), on its second digital subcarrier.  It airs mostly alternative and world music. In the spring of 2010, the station added a third digital stream, Classical 90.7 KWMU-3, a 24-hour classical music service.  Both stream live on the Internet.

On September 10, 2009, the station rebranded as St. Louis Public Radio and its website to stlpublicradio.org.

In September 2010, STLPR became the radio outlet for live broadcasts of the St. Louis Symphony Orchestra broadcasting its Saturday night concerts from Powell Symphony Hall.

In April 2011, STLPR broke ground on a state-of-the-art studio facility at Grand Center. The facility also houses academic space for UMSL. On June 18, 2012, STLPR moved from its longtime home on the first floor of Lucas Hall on the UMSL North campus in Bellerive, to the new facility.

On July 26, 2012, UMSL officially acquired WQUB from Quincy University. The station now serves as a semi-satellite of KWMU in the Tri-State Area.

Beginning July 1, 2017, UMSL adopted Rolla station KMST as a satellite of KWMU for south-central Missouri.

Finances
The station receives its funding from private donations, corporate sponsors, local, regional and national grants, as well as the University of Missouri-St. Louis.

In Fiscal Year 2019, STLPR's revenue totaled $8,856,000. Its sources were from:
92% Community Support
6% Corporation for Public Broadcasting & Missouri Public Broadcasting
2% Other Grants

Revenue from Community Support totaled $8,130,000. Its sources were from:
74% Individual & Foundation Support
22% Corporate Support
4% Events and Other Support

References
St. Louis Public Radio's 2009 Annual Report

External links
St. Louis Public Radio official website

WMU
NPR member stations
Radio stations established in 1972
University of Missouri–St. Louis